Zhengzhou Foreign Language School [ZZFLS] (郑州 外国语 学校 Zhèng-zhōu wài-guó-yǔ xué-xiào) is a middle-high school in Henan, China. It is located in the Zhengzhou High & New Technology Industries Development Zone. With a student body of approximately 4,000, it was established by local government in 1983. However, it has since become privately owned.

Entrance to the school is highly selective both academically and physically. The students and teachers come from Henan Province and beyond. All international teachers are carefully selected. The school has multi-media classrooms, model experimental labs, an outdoor track, and nearby residence halls with dining facilities. Zhengzhou Foreign Language School provides a range of advanced facilities to students. All teachers have bachelor's degrees and many have master's degrees. Some of the teachers are professionally trained in math, physics, chemistry and biology.

The primary focus of Zhengzhou Foreign Language School is national. However, the school also has small international programs for those seeking admission to schools in Great Britain, Australia, and the United States. The school has a U.S. College Board Advanced Placement (AP) Program with approximately 250 students in attendance. These students are prepared for the TOEFL, SATs, and AP tests. Seniors are guided in completion and submission of the Common Application for university admission to the Ivy League and other top schools in the United States. The AP Program graduates over 38 seniors each year and all seniors are admitted to select American schools. In a 2016 ranking of Chinese high schools that send students to study in American universities, it ranked number 17 in mainland China in terms of the number of students entering top American universities.

Achievement
A total of 76 students were sent to Tsinghua University and Peking University from 2002 to 2007.  In 2007, the university enrollment rate for all seniors was the first in Henan Province.
In 2012, 230 students were recommended to enter top-tier Chinese universities without the usually-required national college entrance examination. Another 49 students were admitted by top-tier overseas universities.

Sister Schools 
 Hangzhou Foreign Language School

References

External links
Official website

Education in Zhengzhou
Education in Henan